"Why Did It Have to Be Me?" is a song by the Swedish pop band ABBA. The song was released on the 1976 album Arrival. "Why Did It Have to Be Me?" has been called a "Fats Domino flavoured" song, and has been noted for its mix of blues, jazz, pop and rock stylings.

A live version of the song appears on the album Live at Wembley Arena.

Background
"Why Did It Have To Be Me" was the final song to be completed for Arrival. Originally, the song "Happy Hawaii", a song featuring lead vocals by Agnetha Fältskog and Anni-Frid Lyngstad, was written for the album; however, this was discarded. A more country-styled track was then attempted, but it too was discarded. The song was then re-written and rerecorded, becoming "Why Did It Have To Be Me?", as a duet between Björn Ulvaeus and Anni-Frid Lyngstad. "Happy Hawaii" was later released as the B-side to the hit single "Knowing Me, Knowing You" released in 1977 and as a bonus track on selected versions of the Arrival album.

Reception
Pitchfork described the song as "Björn’s barroom boogie about a sap who loses his heart, all but one lap-steel and two fingers of whisky short of vintage Hank Williams" and notes the use of a male voice in the album, as it is the only song on the album featuring Ulvaeus on lead vocals. Similarly, Sputnikmusic notes the song as being "for the guys" and praises it as an example of the "professional songwriting" on the album.

Mamma Mia! Here We Go Again version
Lily James, Josh Dylan and Hugh Skinner recorded a cover of "Why Did It Have to Be Me?" for the soundtrack of Mamma Mia! Here We Go Again. The version was released on July 13, 2018 alongside the rest of the soundtrack, by Capitol and Polydor Records. The song was produced by Benny Andersson.

Charts

Certifications

References

ABBA songs
Songs written by Benny Andersson and Björn Ulvaeus
1976 songs